Nijon is a former commune in the Haute-Marne department in north-eastern France. On 1 June 2016, it was merged into the new commune of Bourmont-entre-Meuse-et-Mouzon. Its population was 102 in 2019.

See also
Communes of the Haute-Marne department

References

Former communes of Haute-Marne